Music Goes Round and Round is a Tommy Dorsey album of Dixieland recordings from 1935 to 1947, that predated the New Orleans revival in 1940.

Track listing

Personnel
 Clarinet: Johnny Mince, Joe Dixon
 Tenor Sax: Bud Freeman
 Trombone: Tommy Dorsey
 Trumpeters: Yank Lawson, Max Kaminsky, Pee Wee Erwin
 Vocals: Edythe Wright

References

1991 compilation albums
Tommy Dorsey albums